South Carolina Highway 6 Truck may refer to:

South Carolina Highway 6 Truck (Elloree), a truck route approximately halfway in Elloree
South Carolina Highway 6 Truck (Moncks Corner), a truck route entirely in Moncks Corner

006 Truck
006 Truck